Dundalk entered the 2000–01 League of Ireland First Division season having finished fourth the previous season, thus missing out on a promotion/relegation play-off. Manager Martin Murray was entering his first season in charge, having replaced Terry Eviston during the summer. It was Dundalk's second season in the second tier of Irish football, and their 75th consecutive season in the League of Ireland.

Season summary
Following the financial difficulties of the mid- and late-1990s, and relegation for the first time at the end of the 1998–99 season, the club had been taken over by the Dundalk F.C. Co-operative in March 2000, returning it to a supporter-owned, membership-based company model. The previous season there had been expectations of an immediate return to the top-flight, but a poor start left them struggling to catch the leaders and, with a play-off spot seemingly secured, the club became embroiled in a losing battle with the league's hierarchy and Kilkenny City. The row, over Kilkenny playing an improperly registered player, reached the High Court, who sided with Kilkenny thus handing them the play-off spot.

Relegation in 1999 had resulted in a large turnover of players – 31 different players making League appearances in the 1999–2000 season alone. With new ownership, and a new manager, there was more of the same. A number of local players had been retained from the previous season's squad, but another ten players were signed before and during the season, so that 21 players in total would make league starts. The previous season's disappointment, and the number of players coming and going, meant that hopes were low going into the new season. The 36-match schedule got under way on 11 August 2000, and Dundalk had a promising start, leading by the end of the month. But a slump in form saw them risk losing touch with fellow pace-setters, Athlone Town, obliging Murray to bring more players in. A victory over Athlone in November, and a five-game winning streak, kept the gap to four points as the other sides fell away.

The season was nearly derailed, however, when the 2001 United Kingdom foot-and-mouth outbreak lead to an exclusion zone being put in place around County Louth. Many public events were postponed or cancelled, and Dundalk went the whole of March without playing a match. They had beaten Shelbourne in the first round of the Leinster Senior Cup, but the crisis saw the competition ultimately abandoned for the season, and it would be 2010 before it was revived. In the second round of the FAI Cup they had been drawn against non-league Malahide United, and the game had been postponed four times as the crisis wore on. At the fifth attempt, the match was played behind closed doors at a neutral venue, and Dundalk were knocked out in the first match they had played in over five weeks. Two heavy league defeats followed as they struggled to get back up to speed, with home matches having to be played in United Park in Drogheda. But four wins in a row, including a 2–1 victory over Athlone in the first match played in Oriel Park in over two months, meant Dundalk had won the First Division title (their first), and secured promotion back to the Premier Division for 2001–02 with a game to spare.

First-Team Squad (2000–01)
Sources:

Competitions

League Cup
Source:
Group

Did not qualify

Leinster Senior Cup
Source:
First Round

Competition subsequently abandoned

FAI Cup
Source:
First Round

Second Round

First Division
Source:

League table

Source:www.rsssf.com

References
Bibliography

Citations

Dundalk F.C. seasons
Dundalk